Fillipovskaya is a rural locality (a village) in Vinogradovsky District, Arkhangelsk Oblast, Russia. The population was 5 as of 2012.

Geography 
Fillipovskaya is located on the Severnaya Dvina River, 38 km southeast of Bereznik (the district's administrative centre) by road. Sidorovskaya is the nearest rural locality.

References 

Rural localities in Vinogradovsky District